The 9th Army was a World War I and World War II field army of the Royal Italian Army.

World War I 
After the Battle of Caporetto (November 1917) the Italian Army was completely reorganized by Armando Diaz. The new 9th Italian Army was formed under command of Paolo Morrone. 
It consisted of:
 two army corps
 one cavalry corps
 the 6th Czechoslovak Division

It participated as reserve in the successful battles of the Piave River (June 1918) and Vittorio Veneto (October–November 1918).

World War II 
It was involved in the abortive Italian invasion of Greece in 1940, and the invasion of Yugoslavia in 1941. It then became the Italian garrison of the occupied or annexed territories of the Kingdom of Albania and the Italian governorate of Montenegro until the Italian surrender in 1943.

Its commanders were
 Mario Vercellino (1940-1941)
 Alessandro Pirzio Biroli (1941 - July 1943)
 Renzo Dalmazzo (July 1943 - September 1943)

Footnotes

References
 

Field armies of Italy in World War I
Field armies of Italy in World War II
Italian military units and formations of the Greco-Italian War
Albania in World War II
Military units and formations of Italy in Yugoslavia in World War II
Military units and formations disestablished in 1943
Military units and formations established in 1940